A susceptor is a material used for its ability to absorb electromagnetic energy and convert it to heat (which in some cases is re-emitted as infrared thermal radiation). The electromagnetic energy is typically radiofrequency or microwave radiation used in industrial heating processes, and also in microwave cooking.

Operation 

In microwave cooking, susceptors are built into paper packaging of certain foods, where they absorb microwaves which penetrate the packaging. This process raises the susceptor patch temperature to levels where it may then heat food by conduction or by infrared radiation.

 Conduction heating occurs with good thermal contact between the susceptor and food. Because of the lower temperatures there is less browning, but more than if there were no susceptor at all.
 If there is an air gap (or at least, poor thermal contact) between the susceptor and food, the susceptor will heat to a much higher temperature (due to its smaller effective heat capacity when in poor contact with food), and, at these higher temperatures, will radiate strongly in the infrared. This infrared radiation then shines onto the food below or next to the susceptor, causing a "broiling" type effect (high skin heating) due to lower ability of infrared to penetrate foods, vs. microwaves. Conversion of some microwave energy to infrared is particularly useful for foods which require a large amount of crust-browning from infrared, such as frozen pies.

Design and use 

Susceptors are usually made of metallised film, ceramics or metals (such as aluminium flakes).

The susceptor (which may be located on examination by its gray or blue-gray color, which is different from paper) is the reason products meant to be browned via susceptor-generated thermal radiation carry instructions to microwave the food while still inside its packaging.

Susceptors meant to heat foods by direct conduction, where less browning will occur, may be seen in the gray lining of packaging directly holding the food and in good contact with it. A typical example of the latter is the paper-susceptor–lined dish directly holding a microwaveable pot pie or casserole.

Susceptors built into packaging create high temperatures in a microwave oven. This is useful for crisping and browning foods, as well as concentrating heat on the oil in a microwave popcorn bag (which is solid at room temperature) in order to melt it rapidly.

Among the first microwave susceptors marketed were those from the mid-1980s in a product called McCain Micro Chips by McCain Foods. It consisted of a susceptor sheet which cooked French fries in a microwave oven. These sheets are currently used in several types of packaging for heating and cooking products in microwave ovens. Care in package design and use is required for proper food safety.

A "crisping sleeve" is a device made of paperboard and affixed with a susceptor used both as a rigid container to support the food items within and to focus heat on the foodstuff. They are generally intended for a single use. Hot Pockets is an example of a product which uses crisping sleeves.

See also
Microwave heat distribution

References

Further reading 

 Yam, K. L., "Encyclopedia of Packaging Technology", John Wiley & Sons, 2009,

External links 
 "Susceptor heating" on commercial website
 Susceptor heating film on fast food package with carbon-based coatings

Cooking appliances
Packaging materials
Electromechanical engineering
Microwave technology
American inventions